Posuj (also Romanized as Posūj and Pasūj; also known as Posūch, Pasūch, Pasuk, Pūch, and Seyyedābād) is a village in Alqurat Rural District, in the Central District of Birjand County, South Khorasan Province, Iran. At the 2006 census, its population was 72, in 27 families.

References 

Populated places in Birjand County